The following is a list of episodes for the animated television series Johnny Test.

On June 11, 2013, Teletoon announced that the series had been renewed for a seventh season, to consist of 13 episodes and a three-part special. However, in response to a tweet on June 25, 2015, regarding a seventh season, voice actor James Arnold Taylor stated that there were "no there's no plans for it".

Series overview

Episodes

Season 1 (2005–06)

Season 2 (2006–07)

Season 3 (2007–08)

Season 4 (2009–11)

Season 5 (2011–12)

Season 6 (2013–14)

The Lost Web Series Short (2020)

References

Notes

External links

 

 	

Episodes
Lists of Canadian children's animated television series episodes	
Lists of American children's animated television series episodes
Lists of American science fiction television series episodes